Cochylis eutheta is a species of moth of the family Tortricidae. It is found in Mexico in the states of Veracruz and Tamaulipas.

References

Moths described in 1984
Cochylis